Kuzminskoye is a rural locality (a village) in Meleuzovsky Selsoviet, Meleuzovsky District, Bashkortostan, Russia. The population was 225 as of 2010. There are 3 streets.

Geography 
Kuzminskoye is located 5 km south of Meleuz (the district's administrative centre) by road. Karan is the nearest rural locality.

References 

Rural localities in Meleuzovsky District